"Wish/Starless Night" is Olivia's 10th single, and is her second single to be released under the name Olivia Lufkin Inspired by Reira (Trapnest). It was released on CD and CD&DVD on October 11, 2006. The two title tracks were recorded specifically for the Nana anime. "Wish" was used as the second opening theme and "Starless Night" was used as the second ending theme to the show. 
"Wish/Starless Night" is currently Olivia's highest debuting single, at #7 on the Oricon weekly charts.

Total sales thus far have reached 27,854 copies.

Track listing
CD track list
 "Wish"
 "Starless Night"
 "Close Your Eyes" / Olivia

DVD track list
 "Wish" <Video Clip>
 Trapnest Original Animation Clip

Personnel 
 Vocals by Olivia Lufkin
 Keyboard & Programming by Tomoji Sogawa
 Guitar & Bass by Susumu Nishikawa
 Guitar & Synthesizer by Kansei
 Guitar by Makoto Totani
 Programming by Jeffrey Lufkin

Oricon Charts

2006 singles
Olivia Lufkin songs
2006 songs